The Agricultural Livestock Party of Greece (AKKEL) is a Greek political party founded in May 2014 with Evangelos (Vakis) Tsiombanidis as president. The headquarters of the Party is located in Sakko Orestiada.

History 
The AKKEL participated autonomously with his own ballot in the 2014 European election, where received 0.57% (32,366 votes). In the national elections of January 2015, he participated as a coalition of parties with the Independent Greeks, the Christian Democratic Party of the Overthrow, the Fiery Greece and the LEYKO, a cooperation that was not repeated in the early parliamentary elections of the same year. In February 2019, AKKEL participated in an event and meeting as a founding member together with the Italian party 5 Star Movement, the Croatian Human Shield, the Polish Kukiz'15 and the Finnish Movement Now with the aim of creating a pan-European electoral alliance for the May 2019 European elections. In the national elections of July 7, 2019, AKKEL collaborated with EPAM where the alliance received 0.50% of the vote. Since 2020, it participates together with other political organizations in the coalition Unity Initiative.

Ideology 
The purpose of the party is to represent the farmers and the people of the primary sector in Greece in general. AKKEL's basic ideology according to the party's statute is the development of the country through primary production and it has raised several issues concerning Greek farmers in the European Union. The party refuses to be placed in the political spectrum of the Right-Left considering it obsolete and divisive, while identifying itself as a unifying party.

Electoral results

Hellenic Parliament

European Parliament

References

External links 

 Επίσημη ιστοσελίδα
 Αποτελέσματα Εκλογών Υπουργείου Εσωτερικών

Agrarian parties in Greece
Political parties in Greece
Political parties established in 2014